Aliazer Thoncy Elthon Maran or just Elthon Maran (born 6 April 1989) is an Indonesian professional footballer who plays as a winger for Liga 2 club Persekat Tegal.

Club career

Kalteng Putra
In 2019, Elthon Maran signed a contract with Indonesian Liga 1 club Kalteng Putra. He made his league debut on 3 July 2019 in a match against Borneo. On 10 November 2019, Elthon Maran scored his first goal for Kalteng Putra against PSM Makassar in the 5th minute at the Tuah Pahoe Stadium, Palangkaraya.

Sulut United
He was signed for Sulut United to play in Liga 2 in the 2020 season. This season was suspended on 27 March 2020 due to the COVID-19 pandemic. The season was abandoned and was declared void on 20 January 2021.

Muba Babel United
In 2021, Maran signed a contract with Indonesian Liga 2 club Muba Babel United. He made his league debut on 6 October against Sriwijaya at the Gelora Sriwijaya Stadium, Palembang.

Honours

Club
PSMS Medan
 Liga 2 runner-up: 2017

References

External links
 Elthon Maran at Soccerway
 Elthon Maran at Liga Indonesia

1989 births
Living people
Indonesian footballers
Persiram Raja Ampat players
PSIM Yogyakarta players
Liga 1 (Indonesia) players
Indonesian Premier Division players
Association football forwards
People from Manokwari